The Chief of Army Staff (reporting name: COAS), is the most senior officer in the Pakistan Army. It is one of the most powerful positions in Pakistan. 

This is the senior most appointment in the Pakistan Armed Forces who is a member of the Joint Chiefs of Staff Committee in a separate capacity, usually consulting with the Chairman joint chiefs to act as a military adviser to the Prime Minister and its civilian government in the line of defending the land borders of the country. The Chief of Army Staff exercise its responsibility of command and control of the operational, combatant, logistics, and training commands within the army, in contrast to the Chief of Staff of the U.S. Army. Due to its stature, the Chief of Army Staff have been instrumental in enforcing martial laws against the civilian government due to the meltdown of a civil-military relations in the past decades.

The appointment, in principle, is constitutionally subjected to be for three years but an extension may be granted from the approval and recommendations of the Prime Minister by the President. The Chief of Army Staff is based in the Army GHQ, and the current Chief of Army Staff is General Asim Munir Ahmed, serving in this capacity since 29 November 2022.

Office of the Chief of the Army Staff
The designation of the Chief of the Army Staff was created from the previous title Commander-in-Chief of the Pakistan Army in 1972. Since 1972, there has been 10 four-star rank army generals to be appointed as chief of army staff by statute. The Prime Minister approved the nomination and appointment of the Chief of Army Staff, with President confirming the Prime Minister's appointed choosing and nomination.

The army leadership is based in the Army GHQ whose functions are supervised by the Chief of Army Staff, assisted by the civilians from the Army Secretariat of the Ministry of Defence (MoD). The Chief of Army Staff exercise its responsibility of complete operational, training and logistics commands.

There are several principle staff officers (PSO) who assist in running the operations of the Army GHQ:

 Engineer-in-Chief (Eng-in-C)
 Chief of General Staff
 Chief of Logistics Staff
 Inspector-General of Training and Evaluation (IGT&E)
 Inspector-General Communications and IT (IGC&IT)
 Inspector-General Arms (IG Arms)
 Military Secretary (Mil Secy)
 Adjutant-General
 Quartermaster General (QMG)
 Master-General of Ordnance (MGO)
 Judge Advocate General Corps
 Director-General EME (DGEME)
 Director-General Frontier Works Organisation (DGFWO)
 DG Combat Development Directorate

List of Chiefs of Army Staff

See also
Chairman Joint Chiefs of Staff Committee
List of serving generals of the Pakistan Army
Chief of Air Staff (Pakistan)
Chief of Naval Staff (Pakistan)
Chief of General Staff (Pakistan)

References

External links
Official Pakistan Army website
Inter-Services Public Relations

C
Pakistan